Ouanaminthe is an arrondissement in the Nord-Est department of Haiti. As of 2015, the population was 146,484 inhabitants. Postal codes in the Ouanaminthe Arrondissement start with the number 22.

The arondissement consists of the following municipalities:
 Ouanaminthe
 Capotille
 Mont-Organisé

References

Arrondissements of Haiti
Nord-Est (department)